
The Hennen Building, also known as the Canal-Commercial Building, Maritime Building, and briefly the Latter & Blum Building,  is an 11-story, -tall skyscraper in New Orleans, Louisiana USA. Individually listed on the National Register of Historic Places (NRHP), the building is located at 800 Common Street at the uptown lake corner with Carondelet Street.  It is also NRHP-listed as a contributing building in New Orleans' Central Business District.  The building is New Orleans' first and oldest skyscraper, holding the title of the city's tallest building from 1895-1904.

It was built as a 10-story Chicago style skyscraper;  the eleventh floor was added in 1922.

The building was sold in November 2006 to architect/developer Marcel Wisznia. Historically an office building, in September 2009, Wisznia | Architecture + Development initiated the renovation and conversion into a mixed-use building with two floors of commercial space below 105 luxury apartments, known as The Maritime Apartments. Wisznia utilized both state and federal historic tax credits along with new markets tax credits to realize the project, as part of the revitalization of the New Orleans' Central Business District.

The building was sold to Orange Lake Resorts in March 2019. The property was converted into timeshares and branded as Holiday Inn Club Vacations New Orleans Resort, which opened in December 2020.

See also
 List of tallest buildings in New Orleans

References

External links
 The Maritime

Residential skyscrapers in New Orleans
New Orleans Lower Central Business District
National Register of Historic Places in New Orleans
Buildings and structures completed in 1895